Sonamarg or Sonmarg, known as Sonamarag in Kashmiri, is a hill station located in the Ganderbal District of Jammu and Kashmir, India.

History
Sonamarg had historical significance as a gateway on the ancient Silk Road, connecting Kashmir with Tibet. Today, the hill station is a popular tourist destination amongst fishers and hikers, and following the Kargil War with neighbouring Pakistan in 1999, serves as a strategically important point for the Indian Army.

Geography
Combined with the alpine meadows that bloom in the summer as well as rivers and lakes stocked with fish, Sonamarg is a notable tourist destination in Jammu and Kashmir.

Climate 
Given its high altitude and mountainous terrain, Sonamarg experiences the regionally-rare humid continental climate (Köppen: Dfb) with significant rainfall.

Demographics
Sonamarg has no permanent settlement and is inaccessible during winter due to heavy snowfall and avalanches. Per the 2011 Census of India, Sonamarg had a seasonal population of 392 (51% male, 49% female), excluding tourists and those working in the tourism industry.

Tourism

Sonamarg provides trekking routes leading to Vishansar Lake, Krishansar Lake, Gangabal Lake and Gadsar Lake in the Himalayas, which are stocked with snowtrout and brown trout. The Sind River meanders here and abounds with trout and mahseer. Ponies can be hired for a trip up to Thajiwas glacier, in the summer. The Yatra to the nearby Amarnath Temple begins in Sonamarg.

Baltal, 15 km east of Sonamarg, is a valley that lies at the foot of the Zoji La pass. Trekkers can also reach the city of Leh—known as "the rooftop of the world"—by crossing over the Zoji La.

The Jammu and Kashmir tourism department organizes river rafting tournaments at Sonamarg throughout the year, which has recently seen the participation of teams from abroad.

Access
Sonamarg is accessible by bus or car from Srinagar, the capital of Jammu and Kashmir, via National Highway 1 (NH 1) and the Zoji La pass. During the winter, heavy snowfall and avalanches block the NH 1, meaning local traffic is only permitted up to Gagangear village, which is the last permanent settlement of this area. The Z-Morh Tunnel is being built to keep the road open year-round, and is due for completion in June 2021.

Gallery

See also
 Dal Lake
 Pahalgam
 Aharbal
 Gangabal
 Kokernag
 Dachigam National Park
 Verinag
 Indira Gandhi Memorial Tulip Garden
 Kausar Nag
 Zabarwan Range
 Sheikh ul-Alam International Airport
 Meenamarg
 Mughal Road
 Kolahoi Peak
 Martand Sun Temple
 Amarnath Cave
 Kashmir Railway
 Kheer Bhawani

References

External links

Cities and towns in Ganderbal district
Hill stations in Jammu and Kashmir
Tourist attractions in Ganderbal district